Pine Creek Township is the name of some places in the U.S. state of Pennsylvania:

Pine Creek Township, Clinton County, Pennsylvania
Pine Creek Township, Jefferson County, Pennsylvania

Pennsylvania township disambiguation pages